Rasgado may refer to:

People
 Gloria Rasgado Corsi  (born 1955), Mexican politician
 Jesús Rasgado (1907–1948), Mexican singer-songwriter
 Victor Rasgado (born 1959), Mexican pianist and classical composer

Other
 Pecado Rasgado, Brazilian telenovela